Asterix is a French comic book series about ancient Gauls.

Asterix may refer to:

Computing, science and technology
 ASTERIX (ATC standard), a European air traffic control standard
 Astérix (satellite), the first French satellite
 29401 Asterix, an asteroid
 Asterisk (PBX), telephone private branch exchange (PBX) implemented in software
 Asterisk, the * character
 Asterix (beetle), a genus of hister beetle

Entertainment
 Asterix (character), a character in the comic
 Asterix (1983 video game), Atari 2600 game based on the character
 Asterix (1991 video game), Sega Master System game based on the character
 Asterix (arcade game), 1992 game based on the character
 Asterix (1993 video game), Nintendo Entertainment System game based on the character
 Parc Astérix, an amusement park near Paris

Music
 Asterix, a German band of the 1970s
 Asterix (Asterix album)
 Asterix (Indonesian band)

Other uses
 Asterix (horse), a racehorse
 Asterix Kieldrecht, a Belgian women's volleyball club
 Asterix (tug), a tug operating at Fawley Refinery in Southampton Water
 MS Asterix, a commercial container ship

See also 
 Asterisk (disambiguation)
 Asterixis, a medical condition
 Astrix (born 1981), Israeli psy-trance DJ and producer
 List of Asterix games